Billy Gray (born William Victor Giventer, March 17, 1904, New York City, New York – January 4, 1978, Los Angeles, California) was an American comedian, comedy club owner and an actor.

Career
Gray was studying law when he won a dance contest, and decided to enter show business instead. Gray was the onetime owner of the Band Box, a comedy club at 123 North Fairfax Avenue, in Los Angeles, which was previously owned by Lou Costello, who purchased it in 1942 from Pete and Billy Snyder and installed Gray as the emcee in place of Jackie Green. Among the performers were Max Rosenbloom, Buddy Hackett, Polly Bergen, Alan King, Billy Barty, Don Rickles and Jackie Gleason.

He and his partner Jerry Bergen appeared in the MGM two-reeler The Little Maestro in 1937. They split up in 1940.

Gray acted on the Abbott and Costello radio show in 1942–43. He played a girl named Matilda, whose catchphrase was "I'm only three-and-a-half years old." He also appeared on stage with Abbott and Costello in their appearances at military bases during World War Two.

Gray appeared in two feature films: he played the Yiddish-speaking agent of Jack Lemmon and Tony Curtis in Billy Wilder's famous comedy Some Like It Hot (1959) and appeared in Two for the Seesaw (1962) with Robert Mitchum, as Mr. Jacoby.

He also appeared in a 1966 episode of the TV series That Girl. The Band Box closed in 1973 and Gray, who drank heavily, died in poverty in 1978. His club is commemorated in the name of a sandwich at Canter's, a nearby Fairfax Avenue deli.

Filmography

References

1904 births
1978 deaths
American male comedians
20th-century American comedians